Vidal Sassoon  (17 January 1928 – 9 May 2012) was a British hairstylist, businessman, and philanthropist. He was noted for repopularising a simple, close-cut geometric hairstyle called the bob cut, worn by famous fashion designers including Mary Quant and film stars such as Mia Farrow, Goldie Hawn, Cameron Diaz, Nastassja Kinski and Helen Mirren.

His early life was one of extreme poverty, with seven years of his childhood spent in an orphanage. He quit school at age 14, soon holding various jobs in London during World War II. Although he hoped to become a professional football player, he became an apprentice hairdresser at the suggestion of his mother.

After developing a reputation for his innovative cuts, he moved to Los Angeles in the early 1970s, where he opened the first worldwide chain of hairstyling salons, complemented by a line of hair-treatment products.

He sold his business interests in the early 1980s and began funding Israeli think tanks with his profits. Vidal Sassoon: The Movie, a documentary film about his life, was released in 2010. In 2009, Sassoon was appointed CBE by Queen Elizabeth II at Buckingham Palace. In 2012, he was among the British cultural icons selected by artist Sir Peter Blake to appear in a new version of his most famous artwork, The Beatles' Sgt. Pepper's Lonely Hearts Club Band album cover to celebrate the British cultural figures of the last six decades.

Early life
Sassoon was born to Jewish parents in Hammersmith, West London, and lived nearby in Shepherd's Bush. His mother, Betty (Bellin) (1900–1997), an Ashkenazi Jew, was born in Aldgate, in the East End of London, in 1900. Although she was surrounded by grinding poverty, Sassoon writes that she nonetheless resolved to make the best of her life. Her family had emigrated to England from Ukraine in the 1880s to escape the antisemitism and pogroms then prevalent. His father, Jack Sassoon, a Sephardi Jew, was born in Thessaloniki, in the northern part of Greece. They met in 1925 and married in 1927. They then moved to Shepherd's Bush, which contained a community of Greek Jews. Sassoon had a younger brother, Ivor, who died from a heart attack at the age of 46.

His father abandoned the family for another woman when Vidal was three years old. With his mother now unable to support the family, they fell into poverty and were evicted, becoming suddenly homeless. They were forced to move in with his mother's older sister. There, they shared a two-room tenement with his aunt and her three children. The tiny flat where the seven of them lived had no bathroom or inside toilet, forcing them to share the one outside landing toilet with three other families. He remembered often standing in line to use it in freezing weather. Their roof was also falling apart, which let rain pour through. "All we could see from our windows was the greyness of the tenement across the street", writes Sassoon. "There was ugliness all around."

Due to poverty as a single parent, his mother eventually placed Sassoon and his younger brother in a Jewish orphanage, where they stayed for seven years, until he was 11, when his mother remarried. His mother was only allowed to visit them once a month and was never allowed to take them out.

Education
He attended Essendine Road Primary School, a Christian school of about a thousand children. He was frequently taunted by classmates as a "Yid" or with chants of "All Jews have long noses." One of his proudest days at the school was winning the 100-yard dash in an all-school contest. "The urge to win has never left me", he writes.

However, he says that he was "a very bad student" with abysmal grades in most classes, except for mental arithmetic. After one session of mental arithmetic, his master said teasingly, "Sassoon, it is a pleasure to see that you have gaps of intelligence between bouts of ignorance." He took a volunteer job as a choir boy for the local synagogue, which gave him one of the few chances to see his mother, who would come on Saturdays.

Sassoon and the other children at the school were evacuated after WWII began on 3 September 1939. He was eleven. "It's a date I'll never forget", he said. "Suddenly my brother and I and all our fellow orphans were on trains with hundreds of thousands of other kids, moving out of London." He and his brother were taken to Holt, Wiltshire, a small village of a thousand people."

First jobs 

After his return to London he left school at the age of 14 and worked as a messenger. The war was in full force with London still being bombed, which forced him to sleep in underground shelters. During work hours, he said "I got used to seeing bodies and blood, and hearing cries of agony" as he carried messages from central London to the docks.

Upon the insistence of his mother, they tried to get him into a hairdressing apprenticeship; his mother told him that her ambition was for him to become a professional hairdresser. However, he saw himself becoming a football player, a sport he excelled at. "I could not imagine myself backcombing hair and winding up rollers for a living."

When she took him to the hairdressing school of a well-known stylist, Adolph Cohen, they were disappointed immediately when they were told it was a two-year programme and would cost much more than they could afford. "My mother looked so terribly dejected", he said, that as they left the salon, "I thought she might faint." A few minutes later, Cohen called them back to the salon, then told him, "You seem to have very good manners, young man. Start Monday and forget the cost." His mother began to cry out of joy.

Wartime activities
At the age of 17, although he had been too young to serve in World War II, he became the youngest member of the 43 Group, a Jewish veterans' underground organisation founded by Morris Beckman which broke up fascist meetings in East London. The Daily Telegraph calls him an "anti-fascist warrior-hairdresser" whose aim was to prevent Sir Oswald Mosley's movement from spreading "messages of hatred" in the period following World War II.

In 1948, at the age of 20, he joined the Palmach (which shortly afterwards was integrated into the Israel Defense Forces) and fought in the 1948 Arab–Israeli War, which began after Israel declared statehood. Sassoon arrived in Mandatory Palestine in April 1948, a month before Israeli independence. He fought in the Negev against the Egyptian Army. During an interview, he described the year he spent training with the Israelis as "the best year of my life", and recalled how he felt:

Career
Sassoon trained under Raymond Bessone in his salon in Mayfair. Sassoon opened his first salon in 1954 in London; singer-actress Georgia Brown, his friend and neighbour, claimed to be his first customer.

Sassoon stated his intentions in designing new, more efficient, hair styles: "If I was going to be in hairdressing, I wanted to change things. I wanted to eliminate the superfluous and get down to the basic angles of cut and shape." Sassoon's works include the geometric perm and the "Nancy Kwan" hairstyles. They were all modern and low-maintenance. The hairstyles created by Sassoon relied on dark, straight, and shiny hair cut into geometric yet organic shapes.

In 1964, Sassoon created a short, angular hairstyle cut on a horizontal plane that was the recreation of the classic "bob cut." His geometric haircuts seemed to be severely cut, but were entirely lacquer-free, relying on the natural shine of the hair for effect. Advertising and cosmetics executive Natalie Donay is credited with discovering Sassoon in London and bringing him to the United States, where in 1965 he opened his first New York City salon on Madison Avenue.

In 1966, inspired by 1920s film star Clara Bow's close cropped hair, he created designs for Emanuel Ungaro. Director Roman Polanski brought him to Hollywood from London in 1968, at a cost of $5,000, to create a unique pixie cut for Mia Farrow, who was to star in Rosemary's Baby.

In the early 1970s Sassoon made Los Angeles his home. In 1971 he promoted his 30-year-old second-in-command, artistic director Roger Thompson, to director of the Sassoon salon, explaining jocularly that, "Twenty-five years of schlepping behind a barber chair are enough!" John Paul DeJoria, a friend of Sassoon, co-founded Paul Mitchell Systems with Paul Mitchell, one of Sassoon's former students. Mitchell said that Sassoon was "the most famous hairstylist in the history of the world."

Sassoon began his "Vidal Sassoon" line of hair-care products in 1973. The actor Michael Caine, who when young and struggling "was roommates with Terence Stamp and Vidal Sassoon – he used to cut my hair, and he always had a lot of models around", claimed to have inspired this, saying,  "I told him that he must have something that is working for him while he slept. I told him he had to make shampoos and other hair-care products." Whatever the inspiration, Sassoon's brand was applied to shampoos and conditioners sold worldwide, with a commercial campaign featuring the slogan "If you don't look good, we don't look good." Former salon colleagues also bought Sassoon's salons and acquired the right to use his name, extending the brand in salons into the United Kingdom and the United States.

The El Paso, Texas-based Helen of Troy Corporation began manufacturing and marketing Sassoon hair-care products in 1980. In 1983, Richardson-Vicks purchased the Los Angeles-based Vidal Sassoon Inc. as well as Sassoon's Santa Monica, California, hairdressing school; the company had already bought his European businesses. Sassoon's 1982 sales of hair products had topped $110 million, with 80 percent of revenues derived in the US.

Two years later the company was bought by Procter & Gamble. Vidal, who remained a consultant through at least the mid-1990s, sued in 2003 for breach of contract and fraud in federal court for allegedly neglecting the marketing of his brand name in favour of the company's other hair product lines, such as Pantene.

He sold his business interests in the early 1980s to devote himself to philanthropy. By 2004, it was reported that Sassoon was no longer associated with the brand that bears his name. He also had a short-lived television series called Your New Day with Vidal Sassoon, which aired in 1980.

Sassoon was twice a guest on BBC Radio 4's Desert Island Discs, on 27 June 1970 and 9 October 2011, when he was also Resident Thinker on the Nowhereisland art project. He was a mystery guest on What's My Line? in March 1967.

Honours 
Sassoon was appointed Commander of the Order of the British Empire (CBE) by Queen Elizabeth II at Buckingham Palace in the 2009 Birthday Honours.

Personal life

Sassoon married his first wife, Elaine Wood, his salon receptionist, in 1956; the marriage ended in 1958. In 1967, he married his second wife, actress Beverly Adams whom he met while filming Torture Garden (1967). They had three biological children and one adopted son: daughter Catya (1968–2002), an actress who died from a drug-induced heart attack; son Elan BenVidal  (b. 17 January 1970); son David (b. circa 1972); and daughter Eden Sassoon. Some sources additionally cite Oley Sassone, a music-video director who spells his last name slightly differently, as a son but this appears to be in error. Sassoon and Adams divorced after 13 years of marriage. His third wife was Jeanette Hartford-Davis, a dressage champion and former fashion model; they married in 1983 and divorced soon after. In 1992, he married designer Rhonda "Ronnie" Sassoon.

Sassoon disinherited his son David, from whom he was estranged. Sassoon in his 2010 autobiography described David, adopted in 1975 at age 3, as an "African-American / Asian boy ... with twinkling eyes and an irresistible smile" who nonetheless became troubled and was eventually sent to a reform school.

Philanthropy
Having had a lifelong commitment to eradicating anti-Semitism, Sassoon started the Vidal Sassoon International Center for the Study of Antisemitism, or SICSA, in 1982. Located at Hebrew University of Jerusalem, it is devoted to gathering information about antisemitism worldwide.

After selling his company, he then worked towards philanthropic causes such as the Boys Clubs of America and the Performing Arts Council of the Music Center of Los Angeles via his Vidal Sassoon Foundation. He was also active in supporting relief efforts after Hurricane Katrina. It also funded educational pursuits on a need-basis in Israel and elsewhere. At the time of his death he had academies in England, Canada and the United States, while planning to open ones in Germany and China.

Illness and death
In June 2011 it was reported that Sassoon had been diagnosed with leukemia two years earlier. He died on 9 May 2012 at his home in Bel Air, Los Angeles. His death was originally reported to be a result of natural causes, and later reported to have been a result of his leukemia. He died in the presence of his family. Los Angeles Police Department spokesman Kevin Maiberger said that when the police arrived at his residence at Mulholland Drive he was already dead. A memorial service was planned for a later date.

Legacy 

"Vidal was like Christopher Columbus", said Angus Mitchell, who studied under Sassoon. "He discovered that the world was round with his cutting system. It was the first language that people could follow." Neil Cornelius, the incumbent owner of Sassoon's first solo venture, called him a "hairdressing legend".

Grace Coddington, Sassoon's former model and creative director of American Vogue, said that he changed the way the public looked at hair:

John Barrett of the John Barrett Salon at Bergdorf Goodman said that Sassoon "was the creator of sensual hair. This was somebody who changed our industry entirely, not just from the point of view of cutting hair but actually turning it into a business. He was one of the first who had a product line bought out by a major corporation".

Books and films
 Sorry I Kept You Waiting, Madam (1968), his autobiography; New York: Putnam.
 
 Cutting Hair the Vidal Sassoon Way (1984)
 
 Vidal Sassoon: The Movie – How one man changed the world with a pair of scissors. (2010), a documentary film directed by Craig Teper.

See also
 Vidal Sassoon International Center for the Study of Antisemitism

References

External links

  – official trailer
 Voices on Antisemitism Interview with Vidal Sassoon from the US Holocaust Memorial Museum
 The secret life of Vidal Sassoon
 —a documentary
 J-Grit.com – Vidal Sassoon – Anti-Fascist Street Fighter
 

1928 births
2012 deaths
British anti-fascists
British autobiographers
British expatriates in Israel
British expatriates in the United States
British hairdressers
British people of Greek-Jewish descent
British people of Spanish-Jewish descent
British people of Ukrainian-Jewish descent
Commanders of the Order of the British Empire
Deaths from cancer in California
Deaths from leukemia
English anti-fascists
Haganah members
Jewish anti-fascists
Jewish British philanthropists
Palmach members
People from Hammersmith
Procter & Gamble brands
British Sephardi Jews
20th-century British philanthropists